In financial regulation, a Suspicious Activity Report  (SAR) or Suspicious Transaction Report (STR) is a report made by a financial institution about suspicious or potentially suspicious activity.  The criteria to decide when a report must be made varies from country to country, but generally is any financial transaction that does not make sense to the financial institution; is unusual for that particular client; or appears to be done only for the purpose of hiding or obfuscating another, separate transaction. The report is filed with that country's financial crime enforcement agency, which is typically a specialist agency designed to collect and analyse transactions and then report these to relevant law enforcement. Front line staff in the financial institution have the responsibility to identify transactions that may be suspicious and these are reported to a designated person that is responsible for reporting the suspicious transaction. This means that the front line staff can ask questions and, in some cases, even decline suspicious transactions. The financial institution is not allowed to inform the client or parties involved in the transaction that a SAR has been lodged, otherwise known as tipping off under the Financial Action Task Force's Recommendations.

The Financial Action Task Force's Recommendations are widely recognized as the international standard in anti-money laundering and countering financing terrorism with endorsements from 180 nations. FATF Recommendations set forth essential measures to combat money laundering and to protect domestic and international monetary systems including the application of preventive measures for the financial sector and other designated sectors; and establishment of powers and responsibilities for the relevant competent authorities (e.g., investigative, law enforcement and supervisory authorities), including guidelines regarding suspicious activity reports. Most countries have laws that require financial institutions to report suspicious transactions and will have a designated agency to receive them. The agency to which a report is required to be filed for a given country is typically part of the law enforcement or financial regulatory department of that country. For example, in the United States, suspicious transaction reports must be reported to the Financial Crimes Enforcement Network (FinCEN), an agency of the United States Department of the Treasury. In Australia the SAR must be reported to Australian Transaction Reports and Analysis Centre (AUSTRAC), an Australian government agency.

Reporting
SARs include detailed information about transactions that are or appear to be suspicious. The goal of SAR filings is to help the government identify individuals, groups and organizations involved in fraud like terrorist financing, money laundering, and other crimes.

The purpose of a suspicious activity report is to detect and report known or suspected violations of law or suspicious activity observed by financial institutions subject to the regulations (for example, the Bank Secrecy Act (BSA)). In many instances, SARs have been instrumental in enabling law enforcement to initiate or supplement major money laundering or terrorist financing investigations and other criminal cases. Information provided in SAR forms also presents FinCEN with a method of identifying emerging trends and patterns associated with financial crimes. The information about those trends and patterns is vital to law enforcement agencies and provides valuable feedback to financial institutions.

Under the Bank Secrecy Act (BSA), financial institutions are required to assist U.S. government agencies in detecting and preventing money laundering, such as:
	Keep records of cash purchases of negotiable instruments,
	File reports of cash transactions exceeding $10,000 (daily aggregate amount), and
	Report suspicious activity that might signal criminal activity (e.g., money laundering, tax evasion)

Each SAR must be filed within 30 days of the date of the initial determination for the necessity of filing the report. An extension of 30 days can be obtained if the identity of the person conducting the suspicious activity is not known. At no time, however, should the filing of an SAR be delayed longer than 60 days. The Bank Secrecy Act specifies that each firm must maintain records of its SARs for a period of five years from the date of filing.

Reporters
The report can start with any employee of a financial service. The employees are trained to be alert for suspicious activity, such as situations where people are trying to wire money out of the country without identification, or activity by someone with no job who starts depositing large amounts of cash into an account. Employees are trained to ask questions about the transaction and communicate their suspicion up their chain of command where further decisions are made about whether to file a report or not.

Many different types of finance-related industries are required to file SARs. These include:
 depository institutions (for example, banks and credit unions)
 securities and futures dealers (for example, stock brokers and mutual fund brokers)
 money services businesses (for example, check cashing services, currency exchange bureaus, and money order providers)
 casinos and card clubs
 dealers in precious metals and gems (for example, jewelry dealers)
 insurance companies
 mortgage companies and brokers

Other related forms
There are other forms that FinCEN requires businesses and individuals to file. These include:
 individuals who transport more than $10,000 in currency into or out of the United States
 shippers and receivers involved in the transfer of $10,000 in currency into or out of the United States
 businesses that receive more than $10,000 in currency in a single transaction or in related transactions
 people who have control over more than $10,000 in financial accounts outside of the U.S. during a calendar year

Confidentiality

Unauthorized disclosure of a SAR filing is a federal criminal offense.

Financial institutions undertake an investigation process prior to filing a SAR to ensure that the information reported is appropriate, complete, and accurate. This process will often include review by financial investigators, management and/or attorneys prior to filing.

To encourage complete candor and cooperation, there are disclosure and evidentiary privileges that protect SAR filers. First, an individual or organization is precluded from discovering the existence or contents of a SAR that includes the individual or organization's name. SARs filers are immune from the discovery process. Second, SAR filers enjoy immunity for all statements made in their SARs, regardless of whether those statements were allegedly made in bad faith.

SAR filing options
Effective July 1, 2012 all SAR Reports must be filed through FinCEN's BSA E-filing System.

A SAR has five sections each containing information about the filing institution or the activity in question:
 Part I - Subject Information
 Any name, address, social security or tax ID's, birth date, drivers license numbers, passport numbers, occupation and phone numbers of all parties involved with the activity.
 Part II - Suspicious Activity Information
 Date Range and codes for the type of Suspicious Activity
 Part III - Information about Financial Institution where Activity Occurred
  
 Part IV - Filing Institution Contact Information
 Usually contains the contact information for the financial institution's compliance officer or equivalent and list of any law enforcement agency that has been contacted while investigating the activity..
 Part V - Suspicious Activity Information - Narrative
 A written description of the activity.

Penalties for non-compliance
Financial institutions and their employees face civil and criminal penalties for failing to properly file suspicious activity reports, including any combination of fines, regulatory restrictions, loss of banking charter, or imprisonment.

History
The requirement to file suspicious activity reports (as well as the accompanying implied gag order) was added by Section 1517(b) of the Annunzio-Wylie Anti-Money Laundering Act (part of the Housing and Community Development Act of 1992, 4060).

See also

 Casino regulations under the Bank Secrecy Act
 FinCEN Files
 Money laundering
 Structuring
 Suspicious Activity Report (justice and homeland security)
 Tax evasion
 Terrorist financing

References

External links
FinCEN: Financial Crimes Enforcement Network — official site
 — Office of the Comptroller of the Currency

Bank Secrecy Act
United States government forms
Banking terms
Financial regulation